The 1933 Washington State Cougars football team was an American football team that represented Washington State College during the 1933 college football season. Eighth-year head coach Babe Hollingbery led the team to a 3–3–1 mark in the Pacific Coast Conference (PCC) and 5–3–1 overall.

The Cougars played their three home games on campus at Rogers Field in Pullman, Washington; two road games were played nearby, in Moscow and Spokane.

Schedule

References

External links
 Game program: California at WSC – October 21, 1933
 Game program: Washington at WSC – November 25, 1933

Washington State
Washington State Cougars football seasons
Washington State Cougars football